Lois Kibbee (July 13, 1922 – October 18, 1993) was an American actress.

Kibbee was born in Wheeling, West Virginia. The daughter of actor Milton Kibbee  and the niece of actor Guy Kibbee, Kibbee played in a number of television and film roles.

On TV, Kibbee's most notable roles were on daytime soap operas. She had a long run as wealthy Geraldine Weldon Whitney Saxon on the CBS/ABC daytime soap opera The Edge of Night, where she appeared from 1970–71 and again from 1973 until the show's end in 1984. She also portrayed frosty matriarch Emily Moore Matson on NBC's Somerset from 1972 to 1973, a character whose eccentric family was involved in a murder storyline centered on "Jingles the Clown". Later in her career she played powerful matriarch Elizabeth Sanders on ABC's One Life to Live (from 1986–88 and again in 1989).

In film, Kibbee may be best remembered for her role in the film Caddyshack as Mrs. Smails. Her character was involved in several of the film's jokes, including a scene where a candy bar in a swimming pool is mistakenly identified as human feces.

Kibbee died of a brain tumor on October 18, 1993, at Memorial Sloan Kettering Cancer Center in Manhattan.

Acting career
In 1951, Kibbee established Playhouse, Inc., a community theater in El Paso, Texas.

Kibbee acted on radio on Lux Radio Theatre, Yours Truly, Johnny Dollar, and other programs. Later, she portrayed Geraldine Whitney Saxson on The Edge of Nigh on TV.

Writing career
Kibbee was a writer on The Edge of Night. and co-wrote the book The Bennett Playbill about the life of the Bennett acting family, particularly film, stage and television star, Joan Bennett. She also was the ghostwriter for The Christine Jorgensen Story.

While Henry Slesar was head writer for the CBS soap Capitol, Kibbee briefly contributed a few scripts as well. Kibbee had been writing a book about her family's history as performers at the time of her death.

Awards and nominations
Kibbee was nominated for a Daytime Emmy award in the category of Outstanding Actress in a Supporting Role in a Daytime Drama Series in 1979, 1980, 1981 and 1984 and Outstanding Writing Team in 1982 with Henry Slesar.

Filmography

References

External links
 

1922 births
1993 deaths
American film actresses
American soap opera actresses
American soap opera writers
Deaths from brain cancer in the United States
20th-century American actresses
Deaths from cancer in New York (state)
American women television writers
Women soap opera writers
20th-century American screenwriters